The Democratic Republic of the Congo (DRC) is the largest country of sub-Saharan Africa, occupying some . Most of the country lies within the vast hollow of the Congo River basin. The vast, low-lying central area is a plateau-shaped basin sloping toward the west, covered by tropical rainforest and criss-crossed by rivers. The forest center is surrounded by mountainous terraces in the west, plateaus merging into savannas in the south and southwest. Dense grasslands extend beyond the Congo River in the north. High mountains of the Ruwenzori Range (some above ) are found on the eastern borders with Rwanda and Uganda (see Albertine Rift montane forests for a description of this area).

Geographic regions 
Several major geographic regions may be defined in terms of terrain and patterns of natural vegetation, namely the central Congo Basin, the uplands north and south of the basin, and the eastern highlands.

The country's core region is the central Congo Basin. Much of the forest within the basin is swamp, and still more of it consists of a mixture of marshes and firm land.

North and south of the basin lie higher plains and, occasionally, hills covered with varying mixtures of savanna grasses and woodlands. The southern uplands region, like the basin, constitutes about a third of the DRC's territory. The area slopes from south to north, starting at about  near the Angolan border and falling to about  near the basin. Vegetation cover in the southern uplands territory is more varied than that of the northern uplands. In some areas, woodland is dominant; in others, savanna grasses predominate. South of the basin, along the streams flowing into the Kasai River are extensive gallery forests. In the far southeast, most of the former Katanga Province is characterized by somewhat higher plateaus and low mountains.

In the much narrower northern uplands, the cover is largely savanna, and woodlands are rarer.

The eastern highlands region is the highest and most rugged portion of the country. The western arm of the Great Rift Valley forms a natural eastern boundary to this region. The eastern border of the DRC extends through the valley and its system of lakes, which are separated from each other by plains situated between high mountain ranges.

In this region, changes in elevation bring marked changes in vegetation, which ranges from montane savanna to heavy montane forest. The Rwenzori Mountains between lakes Albert and Edward constitutes the highest range in Africa. The height and location of these mountains on the equator make for a varied and spectacular flora.

Rivers and lakes 

The Congo River and its tributaries drain this basin and provide the country with the most extensive network of navigable waterways in Africa.  wide at the mid-point of its length, the river carries a volume of water that is second only to the Amazon's. Its flow is unusually regular because it is fed by rivers and streams from both sides of the equator; the complementary alternation of rainy and dry seasons on each side of the equator guarantees a regular supply of water for the main channel. At points where navigation is blocked by rapids and waterfalls, the sudden descent of the river creates a hydroelectric potential greater than that found in any other river system on earth.

Most of the DRC is served by the Congo River system, a fact that has facilitated both trade and outside penetration. Its network of waterways is dense and evenly distributed through the country, with three exceptions: northeastern Mayombe in Kongo Central in the west, which is drained by a small coastal river called the Shilango; a strip of land on the eastern border adjoining lakes Edward and Albert, which is part of the Nile River basin; and a small part of the extreme southeastern DRC, which lies in the Zambezi River basin and drains into the Indian Ocean.

Most of the DRC's lakes are also part of the Congo River basin. In the west are Lac Mai-Ndombe and Lac Tumba, which are remnants of a huge interior lake that once occupied the entire basin prior to the breach of the basin's edge by the Congo River and the subsequent drainage of the interior. In the southeast, Lake Mweru straddles the border with Zambia. On the eastern frontier, Lac Kivu, Central Africa's highest lake and a key tourist center, and Lake Tanganyika, just south of Lac Kivu, both feed into the Lualaba River, the name often given to the upper extension of the Congo River. Only the waters of the eastern frontier's northernmost great lakes, Edward and Albert, drain north, into the Nile Basin.

Climate 
Climate ranges from tropical rain forest in the Congo River basin to tropical wet-and-dry in the southern uplands to tropical highland in eastern areas above  in elevation. In general, temperatures and humidity are quite high. In the southern uplands, particularly in the far southeast, winters are cool and dry, whereas summers are warm and damp. The area embracing the chain of lakes from Lake Albert to Lake Tanganyika in the eastern highlands has a moist climate and a narrow but not excessively warm temperature range. The mountain sections are cooler, but humidity increases with altitude until the saturation point is reached; a nearly constant falling mist prevails on some slopes, particularly in the Rwenzori Mountains.

The seasonal pattern of rainfall is affected by the DRC's straddling of the equator. In the third of the country that lies north of the equator, the dry season (roughly early November to late March) corresponds to the rainy season in the southern two-thirds. There is a great deal of variation, however, and a number of places on either side of the equator have two wet and two dry seasons. Annual rainfall is highest in the heart of the Congo River basin and in the highlands west of Bukavu and with some variation tends to diminish in direct relation to distance from these areas. The only areas marked by long four-month to five-month dry seasons and occasional droughts are parts of the Southeast.

Data 
Area:
total:
2,344,858 km2
land:
2,267,048 km2
water:
77,810 km2

Area - comparative:
The 11th-largest country in the world (and 2nd in Africa); it is smaller than Algeria but larger than Greenland and Saudi Arabia. It is about a quarter the size of the United States as a whole.

Land boundaries:
total:
10,481 km
border countries:
"Angola 2,646 km, Burundi 236 km, Central African Republic 1,747 km, Republic of the Congo 1,229 km, Rwanda 221 km, South Sudan 714 km, Tanzania 479 km, Uganda 877 km, Zambia 2,332 km"

Coastline:
.

Maritime claims:
territorial sea:

exclusive economic zone:
boundaries with neighbors

Climate:
tropical; hot and humid in equatorial river basin; cooler and drier in southern highlands; cooler-cold and wetter in eastern highlands and the Ruwenzori Range; north of Equator - wet season April to October, dry season December to February; south of Equator - wet season November to March, dry season April to October

Terrain:
vast central plateau covered by tropical rainforest, surrounded by mountains in the west, plains and savanna in the south/southwest, and grasslands in the north. The high mountains of the Ruwenzori Range on the eastern borders.

Elevation extremes:
lowest point:
Atlantic Ocean 0 m
highest point:
Pic Marguerite on Mont Ngaliema (Mount Stanley) 5,110 m

Natural resources:
cobalt, copper, niobium, petroleum, industrial and gem diamonds, gold, silver, zinc, manganese, tin, uranium, coal, hydropower, timber

Land use:
arable land:
3.09% 
permanent crops:
0.36%
96.55 (2012 est.)

Irrigated land:
105 km2 (2003)

Total renewable water resources:
1,283 km3 (2011)

Freshwater withdrawal (domestic/industrial/agricultural)

total:
0.68 km3/yr (68%/21%/11%)

per capita:
11.25 m3/yr (2005)

Natural hazards:

periodic droughts in south; Congo River floods (seasonal); in the east, in the Albertine Rift, there are active volcanoes

Environment

Current issues 
Poaching threatens wildlife populations (for example, the painted hunting dog, Lycaon pictus, is now considered extirpated from the Congo due to human overpopulation and poaching); water pollution; deforestation (chiefly due to land conversion to agriculture by indigenous farmers); refugees responsible for significant deforestation, soil erosion, and wildlife poaching; mining of minerals (coltan — a mineral used in creating capacitors, diamonds, and gold) causing environmental damage

Environment - international agreements 
party to:
Biodiversity, Desertification, Endangered Species, Hazardous Wastes, Law of the Sea, Marine Dumping, Nuclear Test Ban, Ozone Layer Protection, Tropical Timber 83, Tropical Timber 94, Wetlands
signed, but not ratified:
Environmental Modification

Geography:

D.R. Congo is one of six African states that straddles the equator; it's the largest African state that has the equator passing through it. Very narrow strip of land that controls the lower Congo River and is the only outlet to South Atlantic Ocean; dense tropical rainforest in the central river basin and eastern highlands.

Extreme points 

This is a list of the extreme points of the Democratic Republic of the Congo, the points that are farther north, south, east or west than any other location.

 Northernmost point - unnamed location on the border with the Central African Republic in the Bomu river immediately west of the town of Mbaga in CAR, Orientale Province
 Easternmost point - at the point where the northern section of the border with Uganda enters Lake Albert immediately west of Mahagi Port, Orientale Province
 Southernmost point - unnamed location on the border with Zambia immediately to north-west of the Zambian town of Ndabala, Katanga province
 Westernmost point - the point at which the border with Cabinda enters the Atlantic Ocean, Bas-Congo province

See also
 Subdivisions of the Democratic Republic of the Congo
 Democratic Republic of the Congo
 Former place names in the Democratic Republic of the Congo

References